William Van Zandt (born December 13, 1957) is an American playwright and actor, and the author of the best-selling TV memoir Get in the Car, Jane (Adventures in the TV Wasteland).

Early life

Van Zandt was born in Red Bank, New Jersey, to Mary H. Lento and William Brewster Van Zandt. He is of Italian and Dutch descent. He grew up in Middletown Township, New Jersey.

Career
Van Zandt is the co-author and star of the Off-Broadway plays You've Got Hate Mail, Silent Laughter, Drop Dead!, The Boomer Boys Musical, and 21 other theatrical plays written with Jane Milmore, including A Night at the Nutcracker, Wrong Window, and summer stock perennial Love, Sex, and the I.R.S.  Billy also wrote The Property Known as Garland for Adrienne Barbeau, which ran Off-Broadway at the Actor's Playhouse in 2006.

Van Zandt was nominated for an Emmy Award for his television special I Love Lucy: The Very First Show, and won People's Choice and NAACP Image Awards for his work on the Martin Lawrence comedy Martin and a Prism Multi-Cultural Award for his work on TV's The Hughleys.

Along with partner Jane Milmore, he created and/or developed television's The Wayans Bros. for Shawn Wayans and Marlon Wayans, Suddenly Susan for Brooke Shields, Bless This House for Andrew Dice Clay, and Daddy Dearest for Don Rickles and Richard Lewis.

In addition to starring in his own plays, he has had roles as Bob, one of the sailing teenagers, in Jaws 2 (1978), an alien Starfleet ensign in Star Trek: The Motion Picture (1979), a military school cadet in the 1981 film Taps, and a mobster wannabe in the 1999 film A Wake in Providence, which he also co-wrote.

On television, he was a regular cast member on the second season of ABC's Anything but Love. He was writer and guest star in the 1990 Valerie Bertinelli series Sydney.

He toured in the Off-Broadway hit You've Got Hate Mail which ran at the Triad Theater from 2010 to 2015  and currently tours in his newest play The Boomer Boys Musical.

Personal life
Van Zandt is the half-brother of musician-actor Steven Van Zandt and brother-in-law of his wife, actress Maureen Van Zandt.

Billy married actress Adrienne Barbeau on December 31, 1992. The couple met in 1991 during the West Coast premiere of Billy's play Drop Dead!. They separated in 2012 and divorced in 2018. They have twin sons, William and Walker (born March 17, 1997).

Two years after his marriage ended, Billy and actress Teresa Ganzel met during his Off-Broadway play You've Got Hate Mail and have been together ever since.  They announced their engagement over Christmas 2020 and married September 12, 2021.

Full-length plays
Love, Sex, and the I.R.S.
Suitehearts
Lie, Cheat, and Genuflect
Having a Wonderful Time, Wish You Were Her
Playing Doctor
A Little Quickie
Drop Dead!
Bathroom Humor
Infidelities
The Senator Wore Pantyhose
Till Death Do Us Part
Do Not Disturb
What the Bellhop Saw
Merrily We Dance and Sing
What the Rabbi Saw
Confessions of a Dirty Blonde
Silent Laughter
The Pennies
The Property Known as Garland
A Night at the Nutcracker
You've Got Hate Mail
Wrong Window
High School Reunion: The Musical
The Boomer Boys Musical

The plays are published with Samuel French, Inc. and performed worldwide.

Television
 Life With Lucy (as Delivery Guy)
 Newhart
 Anything But Love (series regular as Harold; Exec Story Consultant)
 Nurses (Supervising Producer)
 I Love Lucy: The Very First Show (Primetime Emmy nomination)
 Sydney (Creative Consultant; guest-starred as Father Van Zandt)
 Martin (People's Choice Award, NAACP Image Award) (Co-Executive Producer; guest-starred as Jeffrey/White Couple)
 Daddy Dearest (created by) (Executive Producer; guest-starred as Maitre'D)
 The Wayans Bros. (developed by) (Executive Producer)
 Staten Island 10309 (unaired pilot; created by) (Executive Producer)
 Bless This House (Executive Producer)
 Suddenly Susan (developed original pilot)
 Yes Dear (Consulting Producer)
 The Hughleys (Multi-Cultural Image Award, NAACP Image Award nomination) (Consulting Producer; guest-starred as Bartender)
 Center of the Universe (Consulting Producer)
 Jack and Janet Save the Planet (unaired pilot; created by) (Executive Producer)
 American Dad (guest-starred as Jerry the dentist)
 That Girl Lay Lay (guest-starred as Funky Old Joe; episode "That Dude Dylan")

Film
 Jaws 2 (1978, actor only) - Bob Burnsides
 Star Trek: The Motion Picture (1979, actor only) - Alien Ensign
 Skag (1979, actor only)
 Taps (film) (1981, actor only) - Bug
 A Wake in Providence'' (1999, co-author) - Louie

References

External links 

Van Zandt/Milmore website
 You've Got Hate Mail website
Playbill interview (March 10, 2006)
SilentLaughter website
The Property Known as Garland website
Boomer Boys website
The Samuel French website

1957 births
American people of Dutch descent
American writers of Italian descent
Living people
People from Middletown Township, New Jersey
People from Red Bank, New Jersey
Writers from New Jersey
Male actors from New Jersey
20th-century American male actors
21st-century American male actors
21st-century American dramatists and playwrights
American male stage actors
American male television actors
20th-century American dramatists and playwrights